Clifford Benjamin Brown (October 30, 1930 – June 26, 1956) was an American jazz trumpeter and composer. He died at the age of 25 in a car accident, leaving behind four years' worth of recordings. His compositions "Sandu", "Joy Spring", and "Daahoud" have become jazz standards. Brown won the DownBeat magazine Critics' Poll for New Star of the Year in 1954; he was inducted into the DownBeat Hall of Fame in 1972.

Early career
Brown was born into a musical family in Wilmington, Delaware. His father organized his four sons, including Clifford, into a vocal quartet. Around age ten, Brown started playing trumpet at school after becoming fascinated with the shiny trumpet his father owned. At age thirteen, his father bought him a trumpet and provided him with private lessons. In high school, Brown received lessons from Robert Boysie Lowery and played in "a jazz group that Lowery organized", making trips to Philadelphia.

Brown briefly attended Delaware State University as a math major before he switched to Maryland State College. His trips to Philadelphia grew in frequency after he graduated from high school and entered Delaware State University. He played in the fourteen-piece, jazz-oriented Maryland State Band. In June 1950, he was injured in a car accident after a performance. While in the hospital, he was visited by Dizzy Gillespie, who encouraged him to pursue a career in music. For a time, injuries restricted him to playing the piano.

Brown was influenced and encouraged by Fats Navarro. His first recordings were with R&B bandleader Chris Powell. He worked with Art Blakey, Tadd Dameron, Lionel Hampton and J. J. Johnson, before forming a band with Max Roach.

One of the most notable developments during Brown's period in New York was the formation of Art Blakey's Quintet, which would become the Jazz Messengers. Blakey formed the band with Brown, Lou Donaldson, Horace Silver, and Curley Russell, and recorded the quintet's first album live at the Birdland jazz club. During one of the rehearsal sessions, fellow trumpeter Miles Davis listened and joked about Clifford Brown's technical ability to play the trumpet. The live recording session ultimately spanned two days with multiple takes needed on only a couple of the tunes.

A week at Club Harlem in May 1952 featured alto saxophonist Charlie Parker and Brown. Brown later noted that Parker was impressed by his playing, saying privately to the young trumpeter "I don't believe it."

Just before the formation of the Clifford Brown/Max Roach Quintet, journalist Nat Hentoff and Brown interviewed for a DownBeat article titled "Clifford Brown – the New Dizzy".

Later career 

Roach's stature had grown as he recorded with a host of other emerging artists (including Bud Powell, Sonny Stitt, Miles Davis and Thelonious Monk) and co-founded Debut, one of the first artist-owned labels, with Charles Mingus. Having participated in the legendary Jazz at Massey Hall concert of 1953, the drummer had relocated to the Los Angeles area and had replaced Shelly Manne in the popular Lighthouse All Stars. Roach and Brown formed the joint Clifford Brown/Max Roach Quintet in the mid-1950s with tenor saxophonist Harold Land, pianist Richie Powell, and bassist George Morrow, with Rollins taking Land's place in 1955. Brown was in the L.A. area from March to August 1954, on the invitation of Roach, who arrived on the West Coast with other well-regarded jazz musicians including Miles Davis and Charles Mingus. Prior to their first concert, the 1954 Pasadena Auditorium Concert, Roach included Brown on the basis that the two would be co-leaders.

The band's creation began when the two bandleaders rented a studio in California. With Brown able to, in addition to the trumpet, play the piano and drums, Roach and Brown were able to experiment with these instruments extensively at the studio. They settled upon the standard bebop quintet of trumpet, saxophone, piano, bass, and drums, with saxophone, piano, and bass players needed. With first choice Sonny Stitt choosing his own direction for his music, the bandleaders settled upon former Count Basie bassist George Morrow, unconventional pianist Carl Perkins, and tenor saxophone player Teddy Edwards as the first group, although this line-up was short-lived. The group that had formed "sent shock waves throughout the jazz community" according to Sam Samuelson.

As the band was still deciding on its personnel, Brown and Roach met alto saxophone player and multi-instrumentalist Eric Dolphy, who had his own apartment where he hosted jam sessions. Among the jam session's musicians were future quintet members Harold Land and George Morrow. Bud Powell's brother Richie arrived in the L.A. area around this time and was recruited as the quintet's pianist. The band accepted recording session offers and Brown composed several tunes that were adopted by the new quintet. Meanwhile, a larger, fully arranged band was organized for one of the upcoming recording sessions by Jack Montrose of Pacific Coast Jazz Records. The session "embrace[d] West Coast cool" with "immaculately performed charts," according to reviewer Gordon Jack of Jazz Journal.

An early session of the Brown/Roach Quintet, featuring its new lineup, was titled Clifford Brown & Max Roach and featured several of Brown's new compositions. Samuelson referred to the album as a "nice gamut between boplicity and pleasant balladry". Other albums during the Brown/Roach collaboration included Brown and Roach, Inc. and Study in Brown.

Brown also recorded albums outside of the quintet, including the Pacific Coast Jazz session and two albums with jazz vocalist Dinah Washington. Both of these were recorded from the jam session setting and featured other jazz trumpeters including Maynard Ferguson and Clark Terry. Following the Dinah Washington recordings, Brown slowed the pace of the recordings and traveled back to the East Coast, recording an album with Sarah Vaughan in December 1954.

The experiments in bop continued in the 1955 session Study in Brown, such as use of instrument sounds to mimic an inner city environment in "Parisian Thoroughfare" and "international flavor" in "George's Dilemma". Jazz critic Scott Yanow referred to the album as "premiere early hard bop" and noted the quintet's "unlimited potential."

A 1955 live performance by Clifford Brown with Billy Root and Ziggy Vines, sometimes mistakenly thought to have been recorded just before Brown's death a year later, was released on tape in 1973. Following this live session, the group, with Blakey temporarily replacing Roach at one point following a car accident, toured, visiting Chicago and then Rhode Island for the Newport Jazz Festival. Roach returned for this performance and jam session at Newport.

Released in 1956, the final "official album" by the quintet – At Basin Street – introduced tenor saxophonist Sonny Rollins. The album was a "hard bop classic," and "highly recommended" by Scott Yanow. While previous quintet albums included original compositions, this album consisted mostly of jazz standards, although it did have a couple Richie Powell compositions.

Personal life 
Brown married Emma LaRue Anderson (1933–2005), whom he called "Joy Spring", in Los Angeles, in 1954. The two had been introduced by Max Roach. They celebrated their marriage vows three times, partly because their families were on opposite coasts and partly because of their different religious denominations – Brown was Methodist and Anderson was Catholic. They were first married in a private ceremony June 26, 1954, in Los Angeles (on Anderson's st birthday). They again celebrated their marriage in a religious setting on July 16, 1954, with the certificate being registered in Los Angeles County. A reception was held at the Tiffany Club where the Art Pepper/Jack Montrose Quintet had been replaced, a few days earlier, by the Red Norvo Trio with Tal Farlow and Red Mitchell. Anderson's parish priest followed them to Boston where, on August 1, 1954, they performed their marriage ceremony at Saint Richards Church in the Roxbury neighborhood.

Brown stayed away from drugs and was not fond of alcohol. Rollins, who was recovering from heroin addiction, said that "Clifford was a profound influence on my personal life. He showed me that it was possible to live a good, clean life and still be a good jazz musician." Brown's enthusiasm to practice the trumpet was noted by Lou Donaldson, who said that he would "do lip exercises and mouth exercises all day."

Death
In June 1956, Brown and Richie Powell embarked on a drive to Chicago for their next appearance. Powell's wife Nancy was at the wheel so that Clifford and Richie could sleep. While driving at night in the rain on the Pennsylvania Turnpike, west of Bedford, she is presumed to have lost control of the car, which went off the road, killing all three in the resulting crash. Brown is buried in Mt. Zion Cemetery, in Wilmington, Delaware.

Legacy 

Jazz historian Ira Gitler said of Brown, "l’m sorry I never got to know him better. Not that it necessarily follows that one who plays that beautifully is also a marvelous person, but I think one can discern in Clifford Brown’s case that the particular kind of extraordinary playing was linked to an equally special human being... Photographs of Clifford Brown reveal some of that inner self; the shots in which he is depicted in a playing attitude show his intensity, that utter concentration and total connection with his instrument."

In the 1990s, video from the TV program Soupy Sales was discovered of Clifford Brown playing two tunes. This is the only video recording known to exist of Brown.

His nephew, drummer Rayford Griffin (né Rayford Galen Griffin; born 1958), modernized Brown's music on his 2015 album Reflections of Brownie. Brown's grandson, Clifford Benjamin Brown III (born 1982), plays trumpet on one of the tracks, "Sandu".

Discography

As leader/co-leader 
 1953: New Faces, New Sounds with Lou Donaldson (Blue Note, 1953)[10 inch]
 1953: New Star on the Horizon (Blue Note, 1953)[10 inch]
 1953: A Study In Dameronia (Prestige, 1955)[10 inch]
 1953: Clifford Brown and Art Farmer with The Swedish All Stars with Art Farmer (Prestige, 1954)[10 inch]
 1954: Clifford Brown & Max Roach (EmArcy, 1954)[10 inch]
 1954: Brown and Roach Incorporated (EmArcy, 1955)
 1954: Clifford Brown All Stars (EmArcy, 1956)
 1954: Best Coast Jazz (EmArcy, 1956)
 1954: Jam Session with Clark Terry and Maynard Ferguson (EmArcy, 1954) – live
 1955: Clifford Brown with Strings (EmArcy, 1955)
 1955: Study in Brown (EmArcy, 1955)
 1956: Clifford Brown and Max Roach at Basin Street (EmArcy, 1956)

Posthumous releases
 Memorial Album (Blue Note, 1956) – LP version of New Faces, New Sounds plus New Star on the Horizon
 Memorial (Prestige, 1956) – LP version of Clifford Brown and Art Farmer with The Swedish All Stars plus A Study In Dameronia
 Jazz Immortal featuring Zoot Sims (Pacific Jazz, 1960)
 The Clifford Brown Sextet In Paris (Prestige, 1970) – recorded in 1953
 The Beginning And The End (Columbia, 1973) – compilation
 Raw Genius - Live at Bee Hive Chicago 1955 Vol. 1 & Vol. 2 with Max Roach (Victor, 1977) – live recorded in 1955. Japan only.also released as Live at The Bee Hive (Columbia, 1979)[2LP]
 Pure Genius (Volume One) with Max Roach (Elektra Musician, 1982) – live recorded in 1956
 More Study in Brown (EmArcy, 1983)
 Jams 2 (EmArcy, 1983) – recorded in 1954
 Alternate Takes (Blue Note, 1984) – recorded in 1953

Box set
 The Complete Blue Note and Pacific Jazz Recordings of Clifford Brown (Mosaic Records, 1984)[5LP]

As sideman 
 Art Blakey, Live Messengers (Blue Note, 1978)
 J. J. Johnson, Jay Jay Johnson with Clifford Brown (Blue Note, 1953), reissued as The Eminent Jay Jay Johnson Volume 1
 Art Blakey and The Jazz Messengers, A Night at Birdland Vol. 1 (Blue Note, 1954)
 Art Blakey and The Jazz Messengers, A Night at Birdland Vol. 2 (Blue Note, 1954)
 Art Blakey and The Jazz Messengers, A Night at Birdland Vol. 3 (Blue Note, 1954)
 Helen Merrill, Helen Merrill (EmArcy, 1955) – recorded in 1954
 Sonny Rollins, Sonny Rollins Plus 4 (Prestige, 1956)
 Sarah Vaughan, Sarah Vaughan (EmArcy, 1955) – recorded in 1954
 Dinah Washington, Dinah Jams (EmArcy, 1955) – live recorded in 1954

Filmography 
 1988: Let's Get Lost – "Joy Spring" and "Daahoud"

References

Bibliography
 Nick Catalano, Clifford Brown: The Life and Art of the Legendary Jazz Trumpeter (Oxford University Press, 2001),

External links

 "50 Years Later, Unmuted Awe for Clifford Brown"

 
1930 births
1956 deaths
Musicians from Wilmington, Delaware
20th-century American musicians
20th-century trumpeters
African-American jazz musicians
African-American musicians
American jazz trumpeters
American male jazz musicians
American male trumpeters
Bebop trumpeters
Blue Note Records artists
Delaware State University alumni
Hard bop trumpeters
Road incident deaths in Pennsylvania
University of Maryland Eastern Shore alumni
20th-century American male musicians
EmArcy Records artists
Methodists from Pennsylvania